Annette Kurschus (born 14 February 1963 in Rotenburg an der Fulda) is a German Protestant theologian and pastor. Since March 2012 she has been Praeses (or in German Präses) of the Evangelical Church of Westphalia and since November 2015 she has also been Vice-President of the Council of the Evangelical Church in Germany (EKD). In 2021 she became President of the Council of the EKD.

Origin and education 
Annette Kurschus grew up in Obersuhl in Hessen and in Siegen. Her father Georg Kurschus (1930–2017) was a protestant pastor at the Nikolai Church in Siegen. After graduating from high school in Siegen in 1982, she studied medicine for a short time, and since 1983 Protestant theology at the University of Bonn, the University of Marburg, the University of Münster and at the Kirchliche Hochschule Wuppertal. She completed her vicariate in Siegen-Eiserfeld.

Career and position 
After her vicariate Annette Kurschus became parish priest in Siegen-Klafeld in 1993 and in Siegen-Weidenau in 1999. Since 2001 she was also deputy superintendent of the Evangelical Church District of Siegen. From 2005 to 2012 she held the function of Superintendent of the Evangelical Church District of Siegen.

In November 2011 she was elected by the Westphalian regional synod as Praeses of the Evangelical Church of Westphalia (EKvW) and was introduced into the function of the leading clergy on 4 March 2012.

Since November 2015 Annette Kurschus has also been a member of the Council of the Evangelical Church in Germany and deputy chairwoman of the Council, and since 2016 commissioner of the EKD Council for relations with the Polish churches.

On 20 November 2019 Annette Kurschus was confirmed in the function of the Praeses and re-elected for a further term.

Further functions 
Annette Kurschus is co-editor of the protestant magazine chrismon and the protestant monthly magazine zeitzeichen. She is chairwoman of the board of the Evangelical Press Association and of the supervisory board of the German Bible Society. Furthermore she is a member of the board of trustees of the Detmold University of Music and since 2020 she is a member of the university council of the University of Münster.

Award 
The University of Münster awarded Kurschus an honorary doctorate (Dr. theol. h.c.) on 28 January 2019. She received the award due to her merits concerning the dialogue between religion and society.

References

External links 

  Biography on the website of the Protestant Church in Westphalia (German)
 Editor's column in the monthly magazine chrismon (German)

1963 births
Living people
People from Rotenburg an der Fulda
University of Marburg alumni
University of Bonn alumni
University of Münster alumni
21st-century German Lutheran clergy
Women Lutheran clergy
20th-century German Lutheran clergy